Jawahar Navodaya Vidyalaya, Car Nicobar or locally known as JNV Arong is a boarding, co-educational  school in Nicobar district of Andaman and Nicobar Islands, a U.T. in India. JNV Arong is funded by the Indian Ministry of Human Resources Development and administered  by Navodaya Vidyalaya Smiti, an autonomous body under the ministry. Navodaya Vidyalayas offer free education to talented children, from Class VI to XII.

History 
This school was established in 1987, and is a part of Jawahar Navodaya Vidyalaya schools. Initially school was located in temporary premises at village Lapathy, Car Nicobar and started operating on 22 August 1987. During 2004 Tsunami the school site was washed away. On 26 December 2006, the school was shifted to permanent campus at Arong village of Car Nicobar island. This school is administered and monitored by Hyderabad regional office of Navodaya Vidyalaya Smiti.

Admission 
Admission to JNV Car Nicobar at class VI level is made through nationwide selection test conducted by Navodaya Vidyalaya Smiti. The information about test is disseminated and advertised in district by the office of Nicobar  district magistrate (Collector), who is also the chairperson of school Vidyalya Management Committee (VMC).

Affiliations 
JNV Car Nicobar is affiliated to Central Board of Secondary Education with affiliation number 2540001.

See also 
 Jawahar Navodaya Vidyalaya, South Andaman
 Jawahar Navodaya Vidyalaya, Middle Andaman
 List of JNV schools

References

External links 

 Archived Website of JNV Car Nicobar

Nicobar
Educational institutions established in 1987
1987 establishments in the Andaman and Nicobar Islands
Nicobar district